In mathematics, the universal bundle in the theory of fiber bundles with structure group a given topological group , is a specific bundle over a classifying space , such that every bundle with the given structure group  over  is a pullback by means of a continuous map .

Existence of a universal bundle

In the CW complex category
When the definition of the classifying space takes place within the homotopy category of CW complexes, existence theorems for universal bundles arise from Brown's representability theorem.

For compact Lie groups
We will first prove:

Proposition. Let  be a compact Lie group. There exists a contractible space  on which  acts freely. The projection  is a -principal fibre bundle.

Proof. There exists an injection of  into a unitary group  for  big enough. If we find  then we can take  to be .

The following Theorem is a corollary of the above Proposition.

Theorem.

Proof. On one hand, the pull-back of the bundle  by the natural projection  is the bundle . On the other hand, the pull-back of the principal -bundle  by the projection  is also 

Since  is a fibration with contractible fibre , sections of  exist. To such a section  we associate the composition with the projection . The map we get is the  we were looking for.

Inversely, assume that  is given. Let  be an isomorphism:

Now, simply define a section by

Use in the study of group actions
The total space of a universal bundle is usually written . These spaces are of interest in their own right, despite typically being contractible. See equivariant cohomology for more detailed discussion.

Examples
 Classifying space for U(n)

See also
 Chern class
 tautological bundle, a universal bundle for the general linear group.

External links
PlanetMath page of universal bundle examples

Notes

Fiber bundles
Homotopy theory